Siege of Tortosa may refer to:

Siege of Tortosa (809)
Siege of Tortosa (1148)
Siege of Tortosa (1642)
Siege of Tortosa (1648)
Siege of Tortosa (1650)
Siege of Tortosa (1708)
Siege of Tortosa (1810–11)